Mimnermus in Church is a poem written by William Johnson Cory.

Background
William Johnson was an Eton College master and author of the lyrics to the "Eton Boating Song". He left Eton under suspicion of improper relations with students and added "Cory" to his name. He published a volume of homoerotic verse called Ionica.  Mimnermus in Church contrasts the warm delights of actual life with the cold joys of a merely promised heaven.

Text

Song setting

This poem was set to music (circa 1994) by the English songwriter and composer William D. Drake and performed by his psychedelic acoustic band, Lake Of Puppies. The setting was later given a fuller orchestration by Lake of Puppies member Craig Fortnam and was taken into the repertoire of the chamber ensemble North Sea Radio Orchestra (in which both Drake and Fortnam currently perform, with the former Lake of Puppies singer and bass guitarist Sharron Fortnam).

A recording of the North Sea Radio Orchestra version of the song is on the ensemble's first album, North Sea Radio Orchestra, released in 2006.

See also
Mimnermus

References

19th-century poems